Bernard J. Lechner (25 January 1932 – 11 April 2014) was an electronics engineer and formerly vice president, RCA Laboratories, where he worked for 30 years covering various aspects of television and information display technologies.

Biography 
Lechner was born in New York City, NY, in 1932. He grew up and attended high school in New Rochelle, New York. According to his oral history recollections, he was already very interested in radio and TV receivers during his high school years. He built sets with commercially available kits.

Then, he studied electrical engineering at the Columbia University in New York City, interrupted by two years service for the U.S. Army Signal Corps in the US and Germany. He received the B.S.E.E. degree in 1957.

In 1957, he joined the RCA Laboratories in Princeton, New Jersey, as Member of Technical Staff and worked on various aspects of video engineering such as a home video tape recorder, two-way cable TV services (pay-TV and interactive shopping), TV tuners and TV broadcast cameras. He headed various RCA research groups working on these developments.

While already working at RCA, he did graduate work at Princeton University and at the Harvard School of Business.

Bernie died on April 11, 2014.

Active matrix addressing 
George H. Heilmeier, who had joined the RCA Laboratories a year after Lechner, started working with liquid crystals in 1964. A team led by Heilmeier developed the first liquid crystal displays (LCD). Lechner joined the efforts with the intention of applying LCDs to TV screens.  For this purpose, Lechner's team studied simple matrix LCDs with a few lines and columns. It became obvious that there were tight limitations for the number of picture elements (pixels) addressable by a direct-drive addressing scheme (passive matrix addressing) due to the limited contrast and response speed. Lechner was first to apply a sample-and-hold technique to this type of display by connecting a capacitor in parallel with each LCD pixel and controlling its charge through a field-effect transistor. Later-on, this technique was called active matrix addressing employing thin-film transistors (TFT). It helped, that the semiconductor operation of RCA was among the leaders of MOS-FET developments (CMOS 4000 series). At a press conference at RCA Headquarters in New York, a demonstration of such an LC matrix display with 36 pixels, using discrete components, took place in 1968 and showed the feasibility of the concept for TV panels. A corresponding publication followed in 1969.

RCA reduced the efforts on LCDs and sold the remaining operations in 1976. Lechner concentrated his work on advanced video systems. He became RCA staff vice president for these activities. In this capacity he was a member of the US delegation to the Comité Consultatif International pour la Radio (CCIR, now ITU-R) in Geneva for a new HDTV standard from 1989 to 1990.

Lechner distance 
The Lechner Distance chart illustrates the optimal viewing distances at which the human eye can best process the details an HDTV resolution has to offer.

Lechner researched the typical distance between a viewer and their television screen by taking measurements in many American homes. Given this distance, a Full HD TV (1080p) with a screen size of  would deliver the optimal viewing resolution.

When GE acquired RCA and gave the David Sarnoff Research Center to SRI International in 1987, Lechner took early retirement. Lechner continued his work as independent consultant serving on standard committees and in related organizations as well as an expert witness in patent cases.

Memberships and awards 
Lechner was a Fellow of the IEEE, the Society for Information Display (SID) and the Society of Motion Picture and Television Engineers (SMPTE). He was a member of the honor societies Tau Beta Pi, Eta Kappa Nu and Sigma Xi.

In 1971, he was named the first recipient of the SID Frances Rice Darne Award for his outstanding contributions to matrix displays and in 1983, he was named the first recipient of the Beatrice Winner Award for his contributions to SID. 
He was awarded the David Sarnoff Medal in 1996 and the Progress Medal in 2001 by the Society of Motion Picture and Television Engineers (SMPTE) for his many contributions to the technologies essential to today's television systems. Lechner received two RCA Laboratories Outstanding Achievement Awards and a David Sarnoff Team Award in Science.
In 2000, the Advanced Television Systems Committee (ATSC) established the Bernard J. Lechner Award in his honor. In 2011, he received the IEEE Jun-ichi Nishizawa Medal for conceiving the principle of active matrix LCDs (AMLCD)

Selected publications 
Lechner has widely published in the areas of displays and television systems. He also holds ten United States patents.

 Lechner, B.J.: Testing HDTV terrestrial broadcasting systems, IEEE Transactions on Broadcasting, Vol. 37 (1991), No. 4, pp. 148–151
 Kressel H. and Lechner, B. J. (guest editors): Scanning the issue-Special issue on consumer electronics, Proc. IEEE, Vol. 82 (1994), No. 4, pp. 445–458
 Lechner, B.J.; Chernock, R.; Eyer, M.K.; Goldberg, A.; Goldman, M.S.:  The ATSC Transport Layer, Including Program and System Information Protocol (PSIP), Proceedings of the IEEE, Vol. 94 (2006), No. 1, pp. 77–101
 Lechner, B.J.: Guest Editorial, It's a High-Definition World,, Information Display, Vol. 23, No. 11, November 2007
 Lechner, B.J.: History Crystallized: A First-Person Account of the Development of Matrix-Addressed LCDs for Television at RCA in the 1960s, Information Display, Vol. 24, No. 1, January 2008

See also
 Visual acuity

References

External links
 TV Viewing Distance versus Screen Size
 Viewing distance calculator
 BBC R&D White Paper WHP092, Tests of visual acuity to determine the resolution required of a television transmission system, J.O. Drewery and R. Salmon, 2004.

American electrical engineers
Fellow Members of the IEEE
1932 births
2014 deaths
People from New Rochelle, New York
Harvard School of Engineering and Applied Sciences alumni
Engineers from New York (state)